Cryptocephalus pusillus is a species of leaf beetle native to Europe.

References

External links
Images representing Cryptocephalus at BOLD

pusillus
Beetles described in 1777
Beetles of Europe